Qaland or Qalend or Kaland may refer to:
 Qaland-e Olya
 Qaland-e Sofla
 Qaland-e Vosta